Hector Enrique Maluenda Meneses (born August 5, 1935, in Santiago, Chile), better known as Enrique Maluenda, is a Chilean television show host, politician and fireman. Maluenda forged a career that saw him get work not only in Chile, but in other Latin American countries as well.

Early life
Maluenda is the son of Enrique Maluenda Astudillo and of Hilda Meneses. Maluenda graduated from the Liceo Manuel Barros Bordoño school in Santiago.

Show business career
Maluenda first became a show host for a radio station in Talca named Radio Prat. His first stint on television was a brief one; he was the show host of a television program named "De Fiesta Con Los Flamingos" ("Partying with Los Flamingos"). Los Flamingos was a Chilean musical group of the era; well known comedian "Mandolino" (later known in the United States for his participations on the Univision show, "Sabado Gigante") was one of the band's members and Maluenda frequently shared scenes with Mandolino on the show.

Maluenda hosted that show during 1962, but, in 1963, he immigrated to Peru, where he experienced his first real success as a show host. In 1964, Maluenda was hired on Peruvian television to host a show that was named "El Hit de la 1" ("The 1 P.M. Hit"). Maluenda gained a lot of love for Peru; during a 2014 interview on a Chilean television show, he expressed his love for Peru and said he owed his career to that country. Maluenda worked as a television show host in Peru, initially, for five years.

Maluenda traveled to Puerto Rico in 1968; at the Caribbean country, he was quickly signed by canal 11, to host a television show. The Puerto Rican public gained respect and admiration for Maluenda, but by 1970, he was back in Chile. In Chile, he hosted a show named "Sábados en el 9" on that country's channel 9. This show was created to compete against "Sábados Gigantes", a show which was hosted by the legendary Don Francisco.

Maluenda returned to the Caribbean island of Puerto Rico in 1972, beginning his most prosperous time there. He immediately returned to Puerto Rican television, being again recruited by canal 11 to appear on a television show named "Súper Show Goya", which was sponsored by Goya Foods and where he shared hosting responsibilities with Puerto Rican actors Luz Odilia Font and Luis Daniel Rivera. Maluenda participated in that Puerto Rican television show from 1972 to 1976. Maluenda with this show was able to reach American audiences, as the show was also telecast to Spanish-speaking viewers in the United States.

After he left the Puerto Rican show, Maluenda returned to South America, where he re-settled in his country, having by now gained considerable experience in the television show-hosting profession and become a house-hold name in various Latin American countries.

Back in Chile, Maluenda found work with a show named "Dingolondango", a show which telecast theater plays live to Chilean homes. One of the plays presented during his participation in this show was a Chilean version of the famous play, "Jesus Christ Superstar", which Chilean producers named "Jesus Christ Superstar Andino". Another show that Maluenda hosted during that era was the successful "Festival de la 1" ("1 P.M. Festival"), which was shown live on the Television Nacional de Chile channel from 1979 to 1988. Dingolondango was also shown on the TNC television network.
 
After Festival de la 1 was canceled, Maluenda returned to working on radio stations, as he went on to show host on Radio Nacional. But he wanted to return to television, so in 1992, Maluenda went back to Peru, where he hosted "El Baúl de la Felicidad" ("The Happiness Trunk"), a Panamericana Television show.

Now near the end of his television career, Maluenda decided to return to Chile permanently during the mid-90s. He participated on a show sponsored by the Concepcion lottery, named "Teve Kino" when it was telecast on La Red channel from 1996 to 1998, and renamed as "Fiesta de Millones" ("Millions Party") when it moved to the Megavision channel, where the show lasted from 1998 to 2000. After this show was suspended, Maluenda retired as a television show host. He has, however, continued appearing on televised interviews since then. He also had a cameo as a TV show host in the 2008 film, Tony Manero.

Political career
A backer of Augusto Pinochet, Maluenda in 1988 voted for Pinochet to remain as Chilean President during a 1988 referendum. Ultimately, the votes for Pinochet to leave the Presidency were more than those that backed Pinochet, and Pinochet soon left the Chilean Presidential office.

During 2012, Maluenda became a member of the Union Demócrata Independiente party, a Chilean rightist political party.

Health problems
Maluenda has suffered a number of health setbacks through the years, including facial paralysis in 2004, a liver transplantation in 2006, and having an artificial cardiac pacemaker inserted during 2010.

Personal life
Maluenda first got married at age 19; he and his first wife had two children but she died a few years after their marriage took place.

in 1962, Maluenda met Mercedes Ramirez Quiroz; she was a member of a family that included many firemen-including her brothers. Maluenda became a volunteer fireman himself, and in 2012, he celebrated 50 years of firefighting. At that time, he was still a member of the "Segunda Compania de Bomba Lo Espejo", a Chilean firefighting unit.

Eventually, he and Ramirez Quiroz married in 1973. They remain married and had three children.

See also

List of Chileans

References 

1935 births
Living people
Chilean television personalities
Chilean television presenters
People from Talca
People from Santiago
Chilean expatriates in Peru
Chilean expatriates in Puerto Rico
Chilean politicians